In Amber is the fifth studio album by Hercules and Love Affair, released digitally and physically on 17 June 2022 by Skint Records/BMG. The band's founder, singer and musician, Andy Butler worked again with singer Anohni (previously of Antony and the Johnsons): Anohni appeared on several tracks, including the singles "Poisonous Storytelling", and "One". "Grace", the first song released ahead of the album, was sung by Butler with Icelandic singer Elin Ey.

AllMusic wrote that In Amber, "pivoted away from upbeat, dance-oriented tracks into a more reflective style. Featuring Anohni for the first time since 2008, the record channeled emotions such as anger, fear, and sadness while retaining the pristine production that Butler has cultivated throughout his career". 

In Amber received critical acclaim. It was named "Album of the Year 2022" by The Arts Desk, and Slant Magazine  included "One" in "The 50 Best Songs of 2022" list.

Background, writing and recording
Anohni suggested Andy Butler that they worked songs together and they ended up composing six tracks. Butler then showed other songs he was writing and they realised that they wanted to record as a Hercules and Love Affair project.

The album was conceived over a period of five years. At a certain point they "started thinking about the texture of percussion, something with humanity that might complement the content of the songs". Anohni suggested that they record with drummer Budgie of Siouxsie and the Banshees and the Creatures. Anohni stated: "It had this kind of perfection that was almost sugary. Budgie, as a drummer, completely epitomises that volatile, volcanic texture of creation, but also has a very exquisite form". "He found ways to articulate quite a feminine violence, or a feminine exuberance; a strength, a really fortified, agile, threatening at times power".

Multi instrumentalist Reinhard Vanbergen joined in for the sessions and Butler asked Icelandic singer Elin Ey (complete name Elin Eyþórsdóttir) to do backing vocals on the single "Grace" and the lead on "Dissociation". Anohni suggested that Butler sings more than two songs on the album. It is the first time on Butler's career that he opened an album with him on vocals. Butler wanted to express new things in the songs : "there are emotional fields I hadn’t ventured into previously [...] Destruction, rage, loss, but also redemption and journeying towards empowerment."  Butler pictured the album as dance music with rage and existential contemplation. 

The album was different from previous Hercules and Love Affair works. Music journalist Dean Mayo Davies wrote that In Amber was about 'contemplating the inevitability of mortality, and trying to find peace within that fact". Butler stated he needed to express his discomfort and could not make something comfortable: "making a 90’s sounding techno or house record, or an odd 80’s sounding dance track was not anything I needed to do".

Journalist Martin Aston noted that there were echoes of This Mortal Coil on the record, plus thudding drums which are traces of dark post-punk, which was one of the genres Butler listened to during his "traumatised teenage years".

Release and formats
In Amber was released 17 June 2022 on digital, CD and double black vinyl via Skint Records/BMG. The double vinyl was housed in a gatefold sleeve.

Two limited editions, one on 'Gold' double vinyl and another one on 'Transparent Grey' double vinyl, were available from selected shops and webstores including Rough Trade, Hmv and the official website. The 'Transparent Grey' double vinyl edition which was limited to 300 copies, was available via Rough Trade.

Critical reception

In Amber mostly received good reviews from music critics upon its release. At Metacritic, which assigns a weighted average rating out of 100 to reviews from mainstream critics, the album received an average score of 77, based on 13 reviews, which indicates "generally favorable reviews".

The Arts Desk dubbed the record "a masterpiece of dark music for dark times". Reviewer Joe Muggs wrote that the album brought "stunning results", dealing with dark subjects such as "alienation, mistrust, violent homophobia, abuse, religious terror, war"  but there was also "redemption, strength and love" inside the songs. Muggs added that "the doomed and the hopeful are inseparable, and the tang of each is emphasised by the other ... and musically, the mood is just as finely balanced" before concluding "it’s a truly beautiful piece of work". In a four out of 5 star review, Mojo said that Hercules and Love Affair went dark while adding that In Amber was "frequently beautiful". Reviewer Martin Aston remarked that Butler was "impressively stentorian" and he alternates with Anohni. He added that In Amber was as much Anohni's record as his. In a review rated eight out of ten, Uncut      praised the album saying, there is "plenty of solace to be found in performances by Iceland’s Elin Ey and the ever-remarkable Anohni".

Davies of Another Magazine wrote that "The best dance or electronic music often carries a melancholy" and In Amber sees Hercules and Love Affair pushing to new territory. The Quietus wrote that there is "a wealth of sophistication in the spacious arrangements" and "a richness to the timbres that play central roles in the compositions". Reviewer Zara Hedderman wrote that on "all of the songs from In Amber, this is an immediately enveloping composition which retains its power after countless listens". The Line of Best Fit wrote that "the album marks a break with the past but ... its move ... feels totally natural and necessary". Music journalist Simon Heavisides praised the "spine tingling backing vocals from Icelander Elin Ey" on the single "One" and the songs featuring Anohni saying, "few singers could handle with the requisite gravity but at the same time convey the beauty within what may appear a stark lyric".

Ken Scrudato wrote that the album was "a deeply reflective meditation" on troubling times, while nothing there was a "genuine optimism shining through the sonic solemnity" of the opening song "Grace". In a review rated 6.7 out of ten, Pitchfork wrote:
"Stripping away the dancefloor euphoria of his most recognizable work, Andy Butler’s latest is a moody left-turn highlighted by some winning collaborations with Anohni". For AllMusic, Heather Phares claimed that it was, "thrilling to hear such unguarded yet exquisitely crafted confessions from Hercules & Love Affair as it was to have them transport listeners to dance floor nirvana."

Pop Matters included In Amber in "The Best Electronic albums of 2022" list.

Track listing

Personnel 
Credits are adapted from the album's liner notes.
 Andrew Butler - vocals, all instruments
 Anohni - vocals ("One", "Christian Prayers", "Contempt for You", "Killing His Family", "Who Will Save Us", "Poisonous Storytelling")
 Elin Eyþórsdóttir - vocals ("Dissociation"), backing vocals ("One")
 Budgie - drums
 Reinhard Vandergen - mandola, guitar, bass, strings, timpani, strings recording
 Fitzroy Madsen - saxophone ("Killing His Family")
 Gilles Demolder - guitar ("Christian Prayers")
 Michael Ungerer - drums recording at Blackbird Studios, Berlin
 Francesco Donadello - drums recording at Vox-Ton, Berlin

Charts

References

External links
Official website for ''In Amber
Hercules and Love Affair's Official website

2022 albums
Hercules and Love Affair albums